Mali also known as Mali: United by Blood: Divided by Greed is a Kenyan television series and a soap opera in East Africa. It premiered on October 12, 2011 on NTV (Kenya) and was broadcast in Uganda starting in 2012. Mali is the first Kenyan programme in its genre to run three times a week on NTV. It is written by Alison Ngibuini and Damaris Irungu.

Premise
Mali revolves around the lives of an affluent family, rich to the bone but like every family of this nature, plagued with deeper public hidden issues. The polygamous patriarch of the family is a chauvinist who runs his two homes like a military camp.

The family members are different in character, cultural, social and economic status but are all embroiled in effervescent tales of love, money, power, self gain, seduction and success.

The drama unfolds when the patriarch, Mr. G Mali, collapses and dies without leaving a will behind. This leaves his two families embroiled in a journey of greed, deceit, division and discovery of horrifying family and personal secrets that would have best remained hidden.

Mali is a story of obsession to do what is right but also get what is owed. MALI will take audiences through a journey of extremes that society, the family unit and the individual would go to in the pursuit of love, money and ultimate happiness.

Mali takes its audiences beyond the trappings of affluence to the reality of a family broken and divided and the personal and collective journeys each member makes to reunite the single family unit despite personal odds and societal differences.

Cast

Main cast
George Ohawa as G Mali
Mary Gacheri as Mabel Mali
Mkamzee Mwatela as Usha Mali
Carolyne Midimo as Bella
Mumbi Maina as Nandi Mali
Brenda Wairimu as Lulu Mali
Kevin Samuel as Richard Mali
Daniel Peter Weke as Arthur Mali
Abel Amunga as Mwambu
Tony Mwangi as Tony Babu
Conrad Makeni as Fadhili
Gerald Langiri as Don
David Gitika as Bishop

Recurring cast
Natasha Likimani as Clara
Hamza Omar as Zolo
Nic Wang’ondu as Ron
Marielyn Perez as Nikita
Joan Arigi as Miriam 
Carolyne Ngorobi as Selena
Dan Kimiti as Big Boy 
Kate Khasoa-Kole as Lucia
Charles Ouda as CJ

Featured cast

Gladys John Shao as Mimo
Jamal Nasoor as Ken
Brigid Shikuku as Bernadette
Robert Agenga as Roba
Gerald Kingori as Gera
Charity Odupoy as Eve
Ruth Adala as Ayo
Valentine Mumbi as Lazizi
Odek Ochung as Opondo
Moses Macharia as Mzee K
Telly Savales as Nimrod
Jason Corder as Farouk
Catherine Kamau as Madze
Moses Ivayo as Gomisa
Emmanuel Ikubese as Ike
Joel Olukho as Seer
Louise Hanningan as Linda
Wilfred Maina Olwenya as Kaka
Elle Mberia as Fifi
Raymond Ofula as Juma Biko
Margaret Nyachieo as Saida
Maria Wanza as Atwoli
Victor Gatonye as George Wiyo
Nancy Shiko as Sweetie
Joan Nimo Kanja as Rukia
Mercy Chege as Tawi Babu
Irene Njuguna as Tula
Boniface Chege as Saika
Peris Wambui as Sarah
Kate Damaris as Agnes
Edwin Saka as Kwalanda

Awards and recognitions

References

External links
 Feature article on Nation Media
 Variety International
 Kenyan Actors
 Production website

Kenyan television soap operas
2011 Kenyan television series debuts
English-language television shows
Swahili-language television shows
NTV (Kenyan TV channel) original programming